Rho Ophiuchi (ρ Ophiuchi) is a multiple star system in the constellation Ophiuchus. The central system has an apparent magnitude of 4.63. Based on the central system's parallax of 9.03 mas, it is located about 360 light-years (110 parsecs) away. The other stars in the system are slightly farther away.

System
The central pair is known as Rho Ophiuchi AB. It consists of at least two blue-colored subgiants or main-sequence stars, designated Rho Ophiuchi A and B, respectively. Rho Ophiuchi AB is a visual binary, and the sky-projected distance between the two stars appears to be 3.1″, corresponding to a separation of at least 344 astronomical units (au). However, the actual separation is larger, and the two take about 2,400 years to complete an orbit. The two stars dominate the radiation field around the Rho Ophiuchi cloud complex.

Rho Ophiuchi A emits X-rays, and exhibits strong variability in emission over periods of about 1.2 days, corresponding to its rotation period. The exact origin of its X-ray variability is unknown: it could be an magnetically active spot on its surface, or it could be a small low-mass companion. Related to this is its extremely strong magnetic field; its dipole strength is at least Bd = 1.9 ± 0.2 kG.

Several other stars are located close to Rho Ophiuchi AB. HD 147932 is located 2.5 arcminutes away (at least 17,000 au), and is known as Rho Ophiuchi C. HD 147888 is located 2.82 arcminutes away (at least 19,000 au), and is known as Rho Ophiuchi DE. Stars C and D are both B-type main-sequence stars, and D itself is another binary with an orbital period of around 680 years.

Cloud complex

Rho Ophiuchi is the namesake of the Rho Ophiuchi cloud complex. It is a nebula of gas and dust, which the Rho Ophiuchi system is embedded in. It is one of the easiest star forming regions to observe, as it is one of the nearest, and it is visible from both hemispheres.

The interstellar extinction (AV) of Rho Ophiuchi is measured to be 1.45 magnitudes, meaning the dust and gas in front of Rho Ophiuchi absorbs light from the system, making it appear 1.45 magnitudes dimmer than it would be if there were no dust or gas. Additionally, gas and dust also scatters more higher-frequency light, leaving the light appearing more reddish. The interstellar reddening (EB−V) of Rho Ophiuchi has been measured to be 0.47 magnitudes.

References

Ophiuchus (constellation)
5
B-type main-sequence stars
Ophiuchi, Rho
Ophiuchi, 05
Durchmusterung objects
147933
080473
6112